The Communist Party of Bohemia and Moravia (KSČM) held a leadership election on 19 May 2012. Incumbent leader Vojtěch Filip faced Stanislav Grospič. Potential candidates included Miroslav Grebeníček, Marta Semelová and Jiří Dolejš. Filip was reelected when he received 275 votes from delegates while Grospiš only 168 votes.

Result

References

Communist Party of Bohemia and Moravia leadership elections
Communist Party of Bohemia and Moravia leadership election
Indirect elections
Communist Party of Bohemia and Moravia leadership election
Communist Party of Bohemia and Moravia leadership election